Bilodid is a Ukrainian surname. Notable people with this surname include:

 Daria Bilodid (born 2000), Ukrainian judoka
 Gennadiy Bilodid (born 1977), Ukrainian judoka

See also
 

Ukrainian-language surnames